WEE1 homolog (S. pombe), also known as WEE1, is a protein which in humans is encoded by the WEE1 gene.

Function 

This gene encodes a nuclear protein, which is a tyrosine kinase belonging to the Ser/Thr family of protein kinases. This protein catalyzes the inhibitory tyrosine phosphorylation of CDC2/cyclin B kinase, and appears to coordinate the transition between DNA replication and mitosis by protecting the nucleus from cytoplasmically activated CDC2 kinase.

Interactions
Wee1-like protein kinase has been shown to interact with YWHAB and PIN1.

References

Further reading

External links
 

EC 2.7.11